Phyllobacterium endophyticum is a bacterium from the genus of Phyllobacterium which was isolated from a nodule of the plant Phaseolus vulgaris in Northern Spain.

References

External links
Type strain of Phyllobacterium endophyticum at BacDive -  the Bacterial Diversity Metadatabase

Phyllobacteriaceae
Bacteria described in 2013